Götene is a locality and the seat of Götene Municipality, Västra Götaland County, Sweden. It had 4,933 inhabitants in 2010.

Sports
The following sports clubs are located in Götene:

 Götene IF

References 

Municipal seats of Västra Götaland County
Swedish municipal seats
Populated places in Västra Götaland County
Populated places in Götene Municipality